Ferdinand Gottlob Schneider  (18 June 1911 – 11 May 1984) was a German chemist.

Schneider was born in Backnang in the Kingdom of Württemberg. He studied at the University of Tübingen, Freiburg and Munich (Ph.D. 1934) and subsequently held the positions of privat-docent at the Dresden University of Technology (1941), Technical University of Danzig and professor at the Braunschweig University of Technology (1949–1970). Schneider is the author of the German edition of Sugar Technology and hundreds of sugar-related articles. Professor Schneider was director of Agricultoral Technology and the Sugar Industry in Braunschweig. He taught sugar technology for many years in Germany. During his career, he trained many men and women from around the world who have PhD in sugar technology.

In 1929 he joined the fraternity Landsmannschaft Schottland. In 1984 Schneider died in Pura, Switzerland.

References 
 Mosen Asadi: Beet-Sugar Handbook. John Wiley & Sons, Hoboken (New Jersey) 2006, .

1911 births
1984 deaths
People from Backnang
People from the Kingdom of Württemberg
20th-century German chemists
Ludwig Maximilian University of Munich alumni
University of Tübingen alumni
University of Freiburg alumni
Academic staff of the Technical University of Braunschweig
Academic staff of the Gdańsk University of Technology